MMD may refer to:

Science and technology
 Molar mass distribution, in a polymer
 MultiMarkdown, a markup language
 Multiple dispatch, a feature of some programming languages
 MMD, a loudspeaker parameter of the Thiele/Small model equivalent
 MDIO Manageable Devices, target devices that are being managed by the Management Data Clock in Management Data Input/Output (MDIO)
 Mass median diameter, in particle-size distribution

Organisations
 Mercury Musical Developments, an arts organisation in the United Kingdom
 Movement for Multi-Party Democracy, a Zambian political party
 Microwave Measurements Division, of Anritsu corporation
 Multimedia Displays, a company of TPV Technology

Other uses
 2500 in Roman numerals
 Merchant Mariner's Document
 Mid Manair Dam, a dam located in Telangana, India
 MikuMikuDance, a free 3D dance animation program
 Minami-Daito Airport (IATA code)
 Municipal Market Data, a yield curve of AAA-rated bonds issued by U.S. states
 Murder mystery dinner

See also
 Mini-Micro Designer 1 (MMD-1), a type of single-board computer